The 2016–17 season is Fudbalski klub Partizan's the 70th season in existence and the club's 11th season in competing in the Serbian SuperLiga.

Season overview
On 14 July 2016, Partizan opened season with a 0–0 home draw against Zagłębie Lubin in second qualifying round for the UEFA Europa League. A week later, in Lubin, after penalty drama Partizan was eliminated. Three days later, Partizan opened season in Serbian SuperLiga with another draw (0–0) against novice in SuperLiga (Bačka) at Karađorđe Stadium. In next round, Partizan has lost against Napredak at Mladost Stadium. In that match, Partizan has scored first goal in the season, after 388 minutes. That goal was scored by Valeri Bojinov from penalty spot. After that match, coach Ivan Tomić resigned from the position. On 4 August 2016, coach Marko Nikolić returned to Partizan on a two-year deal. On 10 August, Partizan made first victory in the season, by beating Javor 2–0 in Ivanjica. On 17 September 2016, Partizan beat Red Star 1–0 at home in Eternal derby. The winning goal has scored Leonardo in 89th minute. The difference on the standings with reduced from nine to six points. Partizan made six consecutive wins before he draw (1–1) against Radnički Niš at home, on 22 October. After that match, Partizan made four more consecutive wins before he draw (0–0) against Vojvodina at Karađorđe Stadium, on 30 November. On 15 December, in the last match of the year, Leonardo's goals in 54th minute and in 63rd minute (second goal was from a free kick) was enough for Partizan to beat Spartak 2–0 at home. Partizan finished a year at second place, six points behind Red Star.

On 19 February, Partizan made first victory in 2017 (1–0 away), against Rad. On 4 March, Partizan drew 1–1 at Rajko Mitić Stadium, in Eternal derby, against Red Star. Red Star take the lead in 34th minute (the ball has leave the pitch, but referee did not see). Uroš Đurđević has scored equalizer in 88th minute for Partizan. After that match, Partizan made six consecutive wins before play-off. On 18 April, in first match of play-off, Partizan made a huge victory at Rajko Mitić Stadium, in Eternal derby, against Red Star. Leonardo scored the leading goal, from a free kick in 21st minute, Red Star equalized in 48th minute. Partizan take the lead again, Léandre Tawamba scored a goal in 68th minute. Leonardo score one more goal, in 79th minute for a 3–1 away victory. After that match, Partizan and Red Star had the same number of points, but Red Star had the advantage because had more points before play-off. Four days later, Partizan beat Vojvodina 1–0 at home. Uroš Đurđević has scored a goal in 34th second of the match. On 6 May, after Red Star's defeat Partizan erupt on 1st place. Partizan was on the 1st place for the first time after 637 days. On 13 May, Partizan made very important victory (2–1 at home) against Voždovac. Four days later, Partizan made a key victory for title. Leonardo has scored in 47th minute and Uroš Đurđević in 60th and 73rd minute for 3–1 away victory over Radnički Niš. On 21 May, Partizan beat Mladost Lučani 5–0 at home in front of 26,785 fans and won 27th title.

On 27 May, in the Serbian Cup Final, in his last match for Partizan, Nikola Milenković scored a header against Partizans' biggest rival, Red Star which won the game 1–0 and clinched Partizans' double of the season, winning both the league and cup competitions. After a great season, Miroslav Vulićević, Bojan Ostojić, Everton Luiz, Leonardo and Uroš Đurđević was named in the Serbian SuperLiga Team of the Season due to his performances throughout the season. Uroš Đurđević was named for the Serbian SuperLiga Player of the Season and coach Marko Nikolić was named for the Serbian SuperLiga Coach of the season.

Transfers

In

Out

Players

Squad

Friendlies

Competitions

Overview

Serbian SuperLiga

Regular season

League table

Results by matchday

Results

Championship round

Table

Results by matchday

Results

Serbian Cup

UEFA Europa League

Qualifying rounds

Squad statistics

Appearances and goals

|-
|colspan="14"|Players away from Partizan on loan:
|-
|colspan="14"|Players who left Partizan during the season:

|}

Goal scorers

Disciplinary record

References

External links

 Partizanopedia 2016-17

FK Partizan seasons
Partizan
Partizan
Serbian football championship-winning seasons